Shirley L. Bolton (1945-1984) was an American painter and educator.

Biography
Bolton was born on January 9, 1945 in Lexington, Georgia. She attended University of Georgia in Athens eventually earning her PhD. She exhibited her art at the High Museum of Art in Atlanta. Her work is in the Museum of Contemporary Art of Georgia. Her 1971 drawing The World Outside is in Georgia's State Art Collection.

Bolton died August 10, 1984 in Pensacola, Florida. Some of her papers are in the Art & Artist files at the Smithsonian American Art Museum.

References

External links
images of Bolton's work in Invaluable

1945 births
1984 deaths
African-American painters
African-American women artists
20th-century African-American women
20th-century African-American people
20th-century African-American artists